Andrea Delgado-Olson is a computer scientist, founder of Native American Women in Computing (NAWiC), and a member of the Ione Band of Miwok Indians. She is the chief operating officer of technology startup ZaaWink.

Early life 
Delgado-Olson grew up in Orinda, California, near Oakland, and is the daughter of a financial business manager and the Director of the San Francisco Bay Area field office for the Office of Special Counsel. She looked up to her mother, who served a role model to her as an attorney in a male-dominated field. Beginning her education at a community college, Delgado-Olson got her teaching certificate and taught preschool for 15 years. After going on to complete her bachelor's degree she continued at Mills College to obtain her master's degree in computer science.

Career and impact 
Delgado-Olson founded Native American Women in Computing (NAWiC) in 2014, a community supporting indigenous women in tech. She is currently the Program Manager for Systers and GHC Communities at Anita B.org, an online community for women in computing.

References 

Year of birth missing (living people)
Living people
Miwok people
American women computer scientists
American computer scientists
Mills College alumni
21st-century American women
21st-century Native American women
21st-century Native Americans